Neogobius pallasi, the Caspian sand goby or the Caspian monkey goby,  is a species of fish native to fresh and brackish waters of the Caspian Sea basin including the Volga drainage up to the vicinity of Moscow. It has been introduced into the Aral basin.  This species of goby can reach a length of  SL.  It is also important to local commercial fisheries.

Earlier it was considered as the Caspian subspecies of the Monkey goby, N. fluviatilis pallasi, but is now considered a full species in its own right. The specific name honours the naturalist and explorer Peter Simon Pallas (1741-1811) whose posthumous description of this taxon was published in 1814.

References 

Neogobius
Neogobius pallasi
Fish of Asia
Fish of Russia
Fish of the Caspian Sea
Endemic fauna of the Caspian Sea